is a railway station located in the city of Kamagaya, Chiba Prefecture, Japan, operated by the Shin-Keisei Electric Railway.

Lines
Kita-Hatsutomi Station is served by the Shin-Keisei Line, and is located 11.3 kilometers from the terminus of the line at Matsudo Station.

Station layout 
The station has two opposed side platforms, with the station building underneath.

Platforms

History
Kita-Hatsutomi Station was opened on April 21, 1955. On March 9, 1979, the Hokuso Line connected this station with Komuro Station. However, on July 8, 1982 the Hokuso Line discontinued operations from  Shin-Kamagaya Station to Kita-Hatsuomi Station, and the junction station between the Hokuso Line and the Shin-Keisei Line was shifted to Shin-Kamagaya Station.

Passenger statistics
In fiscal 2017, the station was used by an average of 2590 passengers daily.

Surrounding area
 
Kamagaya No.3 Middle School

See also
 List of railway stations in Japan

References

External links

   Shin Keisei Railway Station information 

Railway stations in Japan opened in 1955
Railway stations in Chiba Prefecture
Kamagaya